The 1988 United States presidential election in Iowa took place on November 8, 1988, as part of the 1988 United States presidential election. Voters chose eight representatives, or electors to the Electoral College, who voted for president and vice president.

Iowa was won by Democratic Governor Michael Dukakis of Massachusetts with 54.71% of the popular vote over Republican Vice President George H.W. Bush's 44.50%, a victory margin of 10.22%, which made Iowa exactly 18% more Democratic than the nation-at-large. This made it one of 10 states (plus the District of Columbia) to vote for Dukakis, while Bush won a convincing electoral victory nationwide. Bush became the first Republican to ever win the presidency without carrying Iowa, a feat that would only be repeated once more (in 2000), and, as of 2020, the only Republican to win the national popular vote without winning the state. Dukakis was also the first Democratic presidential candidate to carry the state since Lyndon B. Johnson’s landslide victory in 1964. The state would not vote for the losing candidate again until 2000, the loser of the popular vote until 2016, and the loser of both the popular and electoral vote until 2020.

The farm crisis of the 1980s under the incumbent Republican administration made the Midwest one of the targets for the Dukakis campaign in 1988, which ultimately proved successful in the region with Democrats performing strongly in many farm states. Nowhere was this more evident than in Iowa, which was the second most Democratic state in the nation in 1988 in terms of both vote percentage and victory margin; it was one of just two states (along with Rhode Island) to vote Democratic by a double-digit margin. This Democratic support was spread widely across the state, with Dukakis winning 75 of the state's 99 counties, whilst counties carried by Bush were concentrated within the state's typically archconservative western fringe. Iowa was also the only state in the nation where Dukakis won by a larger margin than fellow Democrat Bill Clinton would win it by four years later in 1992; Dukakis won 13 Iowa counties which would vote for Bush in 1992.

While Dukakis personally overperformed in Iowa due to the farm crisis, 1988 was also the beginning of a long-term re-alignment of the state toward the Democratic Party, as the historically-Republican state became a Democratic-leaning swing state for a quarter of a century. Iowa had voted Republican in the five preceding elections, and nine of the previous eleven. From 1988 to 2012, Iowa voted Democratic in six of the seven elections that followed (out of the nine total elections overall). Despite this, this is the last election in which Marion County, Buena Vista County, Sac County, and Humboldt County voted for a Democratic presidential candidate.

Iowa (with four counties), Texas (with three), and Montana (with one) are the only states containing counties that Dukakis (as of 2020) was the last Democrat to carry.

As of the 2020 U.S. presidential election, this is also the last time Iowa voted to the left of neighboring Minnesota. This also marks the last time Iowa voted more Democratic than Maryland.

Results

Results by county

See also
 United States presidential elections in Iowa

Notes

References

1988
Iowa
United States president